Sir Henry John Sheehan  (27 December 188326 March 1941) was a senior Australian public servant and banker. Sheehan is best known for his time as head of the Department of the Treasury and as Governor of the Commonwealth Bank.

Life and career
Harry Sheehan was born in St Kilda, Melbourne on 27 December 1883.

Sheehan began his Commonwealth Public Service career in 1903 in the Department of the Treasury. Between 1932 and 1938, Sheehan was head of the department.

Sheehan died of cancer on 26 March 1941 in Sydney. A memorial service was held at St Stephen's Church.

Awards
Sheehan was made a Commander of the Order of the British Empire while Assistant Secretary to the Treasury in June 1928. He was appointed a Knight Bachelor in February 1937 during his time as Secretary of the Department.

References

1883 births
1941 deaths
Australian Commanders of the Order of the British Empire
Australian Knights Bachelor
Secretaries of the Department of the Treasury of Australia
People from St Kilda, Victoria
Public servants from Melbourne